The Bishop of Paisley is the Ordinary of the Diocese of Paisley in the Province of Glasgow, Scotland.

The see is in the town of Paisley where the bishop's seat is located at St Mirin's Cathedral.

The diocese was erected on 25 May 1947 from the Archdiocese of Glasgow. The first bishop of the new diocese was James Black who, prior to his appointment by Pope Pius XII, had been Vicar General of the Glasgow archdiocese. Upon the death of Black in March 1968 Stephen McGill was translated by Pope Paul VI from the see of Argyll and the Isles and remained in Paisley until his retirement in March 1988 whereupon he was succeeded by John Mone an auxiliary bishop of Glasgow and an appointee of Pope John Paul II.

Following the retirement of Mone, Philip Tartaglia was appointed by Pope Benedict XVI to be the new bishop on 13 September 2005 and was consecrated at St Mirin's Cathedral on 20 November 2005. He was named Metropolitan Archbishop of Glasgow by Pope Benedict XVI on 24 July 2012.

On 8 February 2014 Pope Francis named John Keenan, the Catholic chaplain to the University of Glasgow, as fifth Bishop of Paisley. His episcopal ordination took place on Wednesday 19 March 2014, the Feast of Saint Joseph.

List of bishops of Paisley

See also
Roman Catholicism in Scotland

References

External links
Diocese of Paisley
GCatholic.org

Religion in Paisley, Renfrewshire

de:Bistum Paisley
it:Diocesi di Paisley